The 2016 Svijany Open was a professional tennis tournament played on clay courts. It was the 4th edition of the tournament which was part of the 2016 ATP Challenger Tour. It took place in Liberec, Czech Republic between 1 and 7 August 2016.

Singles main-draw entrants

Seeds

 1 Rankings are as of 28 July 2016.

Other entrants
The following players received wildcards into the singles main draw:
  Dominik Kellovský
  Václav Šafránek
  Jürgen Melzer
  Steve Darcis

The following player entered the singles main draw as a special exempt:
  Zdeněk Kolář

The following player received entered as an alternate:
  Miljan Zekić

The following players received entry from the qualifying draw:
  Markus Eriksson
  Norbert Gombos
  Germain Gigounon
  Kamil Majchrzak

The following player received entry as a lucky loser:
  Carl Söderlund

Champions

Singles

  Arthur De Greef def.  Steve Darcis, 7–6(7–4), 6–3

Doubles

  Jonathan Eysseric /  André Ghem def.  Ariel Behar /  Dino Marcan, 6–0, 6–4

External links
ITF Search
ATP official site

Svijany Open
Svijany Open
Svijany
Sport in Liberec
August 2016 sports events in Europe